Live at KEXP Vol. 5 is the 5th installment in the Live at KEXP cd series. Live @ KEXP Volume 5 was lovingly compiled from the best of our more than 440 live, in-studio performances hosted by KEXP in 2009,this CD is more than just a record—it's an archive of one-of-a-kind, exclusive live tracks from some of this year's greatest artists, some well known, othersjust being discovered. Artists include DeVotchka, The Hold Steady, Andrew Bird, MGMT, Of Montreal, Nick Cave & The Bad Seeds, Vivian Girls and many more. All the bands on this compilation have donated their performances to support KEXP a listener-powered, non-profit, listener-supported public radio station based in Seattle, Washington.

Track list
 Save My Soul/Changing- The Moondoggies 
 Midnight Man- Nick Cave & The Bad Seeds
 Holy F#?king Moment- The Whore Moans 
 Both Crosses- The Hold Steady
 The Weight Of Lies- The Avett Brothers
 Oh No- Andrew Bird
 Kissy Kissy- The Kills
 Compacto- Curumin
 An Eluardian Instance- Of Montreal
 Antenna- Zion I
 How It Ends- DeVotchKa
 From A Terrace- Hey Marseilles
 Don't Do Me No Favours- James Hunter
 Electric City- Firewater
 Frontier Justice in an Online World- Wild Orchid Children 
 I Can't Stay- Vivian Girls
 Pieces Of What- MGMT
 Wolves- Phosphorescent

External links
KEXP Official Website 

2009 live albums
2009 compilation albums